St. Thaddeus Episcopal Church is parish of the Episcopal Church in Aiken, South Carolina. It is noted for its historic church at Pendleton and Richland Streets.

Aiken is a planned community, and land for the church had been set aside in the original plan by the South Carolina Canal and Railroad Company. The cornerstone for the original church was laid September 5, 1842. This building was subsequently renovated and expanded over the years, and additional buildings added to the campus. The church was added to the National Register of Historic Places in 1984.

References

Episcopal churches in South Carolina
Churches on the National Register of Historic Places in South Carolina
Churches in Aiken County, South Carolina
National Register of Historic Places in Aiken County, South Carolina
19th-century Episcopal church buildings
Buildings and structures in Aiken, South Carolina
Religious organizations established in 1842
1842 establishments in South Carolina